Anne Olivia Floyd (July 2, 1826 – December 8, 1905) was a Confederate spy during the American Civil War, noted as a blockade runner.

Early life and education
Anne Olivia Floyd, known as Olivia, was the daughter of David I. and Sarah (Semmes) Floyd. Her mother inherited an interest in the property of Rose Hill near Port Tobacco, Maryland about 1843, and Olivia lived there with her family.  She never married.

Civil War activities
During the American Civil War, Olivia Floyd became a spy and blockade runner for the Confederacy. She made numerous runs behind the lines between Washington, D.C. and the Confederate capital of Richmond, Virginia, and was said to have outwitted a company of Union soldiers. She conveyed papers, money and clothing from prisons and prisoners through the lines, and at one time, was holding $80,000 at Rose Hill to accomplish Confederate purposes. During the war, Union officials swore out an arrest warrant for her capture.

Olivia Floyd died peacefully at home on December 8, 1905, at Rose Hill in Charles County, Maryland.

References

External links

 About Famous People
 Port Tobacco Archaeological Project

1826 births
1905 deaths
American spies
American Civil War spies
Female wartime spies
People from Port Tobacco Village, Maryland
People of Maryland in the American Civil War
Women in the American Civil War